Daniel Stewart Thomas Bingham Dixon, 2nd Baron Glentoran, KBE (19 January 1912 – 22 July 1995), was a Northern Irish soldier and politician.

Glentoran was the son of Herbert Dixon, 1st Baron Glentoran. After being educated at Eton and Sandhurst he was appointed aide-de-camp to the GOC in Northern Ireland in 1935. He served with the Grenadier Guards in World War II, for which he was mentioned in dispatches. In 1950 he succeeded his father as Baron Glentoran, as well being elected in his place as Ulster Unionist member for Belfast Bloomfield in the Northern Ireland House of Commons (where peers could also hold a seat).

Appointed Parliamentary Secretary to the Ministry of Finance in 1952, Lord Glentoran was the following year made Minister of Commerce, a post he held until elected to the Northern Ireland Senate in 1961. He was the Minister responsible for the destruction of much of the Great Northern Railway in Northern Ireland, when he unilaterally closed the Portadown – Armagh – Monaghan, Clones – Enniskillen -Belleek and Enniskillen – Omagh railway lines in 1957.  Consequently, the privately owned Sligo, Leitrim and Northern Counties Railway linking Enniskillen to Sligo was forced to close.  He was then Minister in and Leader of the Senate for three years, becoming its last speaker in 1964.

Lord Glentoran was said to have had such a "grand" demeanor that once, when visiting America, a Texas newspaper carried the headline "Irish royalty to visit Texas."

Appointed Knight Commander of the Most Excellent Order of the British Empire (KBE) in 1973, Lord Glentoran was also the Lord Lieutenant (and from 1950 to 1976 Lieutenant) for Belfast from 1976 to 1985. In 1933  he married Lady Diana Mary Wellesley (died 1984), daughter of the third Earl Cowley, by whom he had three children; the eldest is Olympic gold medal-winning bobsledder Robin Dixon.

Lord Glentoran died in 1995 aged 83 and was succeeded to the Barony by his son Robin.

See also
 List of Northern Ireland Members of the House of Lords

References

1912 births
1995 deaths
Barons in the Peerage of the United Kingdom
Grenadier Guards officers
British Army personnel of World War II
Lord-Lieutenants of Belfast
Members of the Privy Council of Northern Ireland
Ulster Unionist Party members of the House of Commons of Northern Ireland
Dixon, Daniel
Dixon, Daniel
Dixon, Daniel
Dixon, Daniel
Dixon, Daniel
Dixon, Daniel
Dixon, Daniel
Northern Ireland junior government ministers (Parliament of Northern Ireland)
Northern Ireland Cabinet ministers (Parliament of Northern Ireland)
Knights Commander of the Order of the British Empire
People educated at Eton College
Members of the House of Commons of Northern Ireland for Belfast constituencies
Ulster Unionist Party members of the Senate of Northern Ireland
Ulster Unionist Party hereditary peers